is a Japanese female announcer for Fuji Television.

Current appearances

Regular

Occasional

Former appearances

Films

Bibliography

Synchronization announcers
Shinichi Tanioka
Kotaro Kinoshita
Sora Hodogai (transfer)

References

External links
 
 

Japanese announcers
People from Okayama Prefecture
1987 births
Living people
Okayama University alumni